Mound Township is a township in McPherson County, Kansas, in the United States.

Mound Township was organized in 1874.

References

Townships in McPherson County, Kansas
Townships in Kansas
Unincorporated communities in Kansas
1874 establishments in Kansas
Populated places established in 1874